ONF (pronounced as On and Off) is a South Korean - Japanese boy band formed and managed by WM Entertainment. Originally debuting as a seven-piece group on August 3, 2017, with their EP, the group currently consists of six members: Hyojin, E-Tion, J-Us, Wyatt, MK and U. The group's youngest member, Laun, left the group on August 23, 2019, for personal circumstances shortly before the group's fourth extended play Go Live.

Since their debut, ONF has since released a studio album, a repackaged album, seven extended plays, and two Japanese singles following their Japanese debut on August 1, 2018.

History

Formation and pre-debut activities 
Prior to joining WM Entertainment, U was a trainee at JYP Entertainment, while MK was a trainee at Starship Entertainment. In 2015, MK participated in Mnet and Starship Entertainment's survival program No.Mercy but was eliminated during episode 7. During the group's first showcase, Laun revealed that he was a trainee at Big Hit Entertainment and used to train together with boy group BTS. All seven members were eventually introduced as WM Boys, and had their first appearance as B1A4's backup dancers at the 2016 Dream Concert in Seoul. In addition, members J-Us, Laun and Wyatt made a cameo appearance in labelmate B1A4's mini drama VCR "The Class", while E-Tion and Wyatt appeared in another B1A4 VCR called "Feeling". Hyojin, E-Tion, J-Us and Wyatt were featured as dancers in the Korean version of the web drama Loss:Time:Life. On May 25, 2017, all of the members of WM Boys attended IDOLCON (아이돌콘) and performed "Original", a B-side track from their upcoming debut extended play.

2017–2018: Introduction, debut and Japanese debut 

Following WM Entertainment's confirmation to introduce the group, ONF released their debut EP and its lead single "ON/OFF" on August 2, 2017, while having their debut stage at M Countdown the following day. The members are composed of two teams, the ON team and the OFF team. Hyojin is the leader of the ON team, which includes E-Tion and MK. J-Us leads the OFF team, which includes Wyatt and U. Laun is part of both teams. The boy group is WM Entertainment's first idol group in two years and three months following the introduction of fellow labelmate Oh My Girl in April 2015, and subsequently the second boy group from the label after B1A4. Shortly after the group's debut, all seven members joined the survival show Mix Nine in November 2017, with member Hyojin revealed as the male center for Mix Nine'''s first performance "Just Dance" earlier on October 28. He eventually became part of the top nine members to debut during the show's on January 26, 2018, placing second while former member Laun placed seventh. The top nine boys of Mix Nine were set to debut later that year, but due to the inability of the individual companies to form an agreement, the project was canceled. ONF then released their second extended play You Complete Me and its lead single "Complete" on June 7, 2018. A week later, the group signed a contract with Japanese label Victor Entertainment to make their official debut in Japan later in August. They officially debuted in Japan on August 1 with a re-recorded Japanese version of their debut eponymous single, preceded by a music video on July 3. They also held their Japanese debut showcase at the Tokyo's Minavi BLITZ Asaka on July 31. On September 7, ONF released the music video for their second Japanese single "Complete (Japanese Ver.)". Their full CD, including two Japanese B-sides, was released on September 26.

 2019: Subsequent releases and Laun's departure 
ONF released their third extended play We Must Love, on February 7, consisting of five tracks and its eponymous lead single. They announced a 2019 Asia Tour of the same name, heading to Hong Kong, Singapore, and Taipei in the spring; however, their Singapore stop was canceled.  On June 27, WM Entertainment announced that Laun was cast as Yeon Joo-hyuk in the tVN D STORY web drama Chubby Romance 2 (통통한 연애2), marking his first professional acting role. ONF performed the main theme for the series "So Pretty" (예뻐죽겠다), released on July 14.

On August 23, WM released a statement that Laun departed from the group and terminated his contract due to personal circumstances. Following his departure, ONF released their fourth EP, Go Live on October 7. The EP contains five tracks, including the lead single "Why".

 2020: Road to Kingdom and Spin Off 
On March 20, it was announced that ONF would join Mnet's reality television competition Road to Kingdom. Their final track from Road to Kingdom, "New World (신새계)", was released on June 12, 2020. It became their first track to appear on the Gaon Digital Chart and Billboard's K-pop Hot 100, peaking at 112 and 97 respectively.  The group eventually finished in second place overall in the program. ONF released Spin Off, their fifth EP and first since appearing on Road to Kingdom, on August 10.  The EP contains seven tracks, including the lead single "Sukhumvit Swimming". They went on to star in their first web drama "Can I Step In?", the first episode of which premiered on YouTube on December 23.

 2021–present: Other activities, new albums and members' enlistments
On February 24, ONF released their first studio album ONF: My Name, consisting of eleven tracks, including its lead single "Beautiful Beautiful". A pre-release single, "My Name Is", was released on February 20. On March 2, the group earned their first music show win of their career with "Beautiful Beautiful" on SBS MTV's The Show. "Beautiful Beautiful" was ONF's first top-10 single, peaking at 7 on the Gaon Digital Chart and topping the Gaon Download Chart. ONF returned with the repackaged version of their first studio album, City of ONF, on April 28, consisting of three additional tracks, including the lead single "Ugly Dance". Like "Beautiful Beautiful", "Ugly Dance" debuted at 1 on the Gaon Download Chart and peaked at 42 on the Gaon Digital Chart.

For ONF's fourth debut anniversary, they released a music video for their song "Trip Advisor" using video submissions from fans all over the world.

On August 9, ONF released the summer popup album Popping, consisting of five tracks, including the title track of the same name.

On November 2, it was announced that all members, except U, will enlist in mandatory military service together in December.  Before their enlistments, ONF released their sixth EP Goosebumps'' on December 3, consisting of five tracks, including the title track of the same name. On December 21, MK was the first member to enlist as an active duty soldier, followed by J-Us and Wyatt who enlisted on December 27 and Hyojin and E-Tion, who enlisted on December 28 as active duty soldiers.

On May 24, U appeared on street dance survival show "Be Mbitious". He appears as a contestant, to compete for a place in a project dance crew that will appear on Mnet's Street Man Fighter.

From October 8 to October 22, 2022, five Korean members serving in the military gathered at the Gyeryong World Military Culture Expo to hold various stages, including busking performances and consolation trains. Among them, the first group stage, Beautiful Beautiful performance fancam video, and the Hype Boy dance cover video of E-Tion and J-US, drew a lot of attention. In particular, Hype Boy's individual fan cam videos received high views on YouTube, Instagram, and Twitter, and were listed on Weibo's real-time search keyword and videos were introduced on overseas broadcasts.

In June 2023, all members will be discharged from the military, with MK on June 20, J-Us and Wyatt on June 26, and E-Tian and Hyojin on June 27.

Members

Active 
 U (유)

Inactive 
 Hyojin (효진) (Inactive due to military service)
 E-Tion (이션) (Inactive due to military service)
 J-Us (제이어스) (Inactive due to military service)
 Wyatt (와이엇) (Inactive due to military service)
 MK (엠케이) (Inactive due to military service)

Former 
 Laun (라운)

Discography

Studio albums

Reissues

Extended plays

Singles

Other charted songs

Soundtrack appearances

Notes

Awards and nominations

References

External links
 

2017 establishments in South Korea
K-pop music groups
Musical groups established in 2017
South Korean boy bands
WM Entertainment artists